The Malaysia women's national futsal team represents Malaysia in international women's futsal competitions and is controlled by the Football Association of Malaysia. The team was once banned from all competitions by the Football Association of Malaysia after the dismal performance of the women's football team at the 2009 Southeast Asian Games. But since 2012, the Football Association of Malaysia has lifted the ban.

Tournament records

Women's Futsal World tournament

AFC Women's Futsal Championship

Asian Indoor and Martial Arts Games

Southeast Asian Games

Results

Current squad

Current squad 
The following players were named for the 2015 AFC Women's Futsal Championship.

Recent call-ups 
The following players have been called up to the Malaysia squad since October 2012.

|
|
|v.  Malaysia B, 2 December 2013
|v.  Russia, 16 December 2013
|v.  Vietnam, 18 December 2013
|v.  Vietnam, 18 December 2013

|v.  Thailand, 22 March 2013
|v.  Hong Kong, 28 June 2013
|v.  Myanmar, 30 September 2013
|v.  Malaysia B, 2 December 2013
|v.  Russia, 16 December 2013
|v.  Russia, 16 December 2013
|v.  Russia, 16 December 2013
|v.  Russia, 16 December 2013
|v.  Vietnam, 18 December 2013

|v.  Malaysia B, 2 December 2013
|v.  Russia, 16 December 2013
|v.  Russia, 16 December 2013
|v.  Russia, 16 December 2013
|v.  Russia, 16 December 2013
|v.  Russia, 16 December 2013
|v.  Vietnam, 18 December 2013
|v.  Vietnam, 18 December 2013

|v.  Philippines, 13 December 2007
|
|v.  Russia, 16 December 2013
|v.  Russia, 16 December 2013
|v.  Vietnam, 18 December 2013

Current staffs

Coaches

Honours

Continental 
 AFC Women's Futsal Asian Cup
 Fourth place : 2015

Regional 
 SEA Games
  Bronze medal : 2013
 Fourth place : 2007
 Pre-SEA Games Futsal Test Match 2013
 Fourth place

Notable former players 

 Shahila Yunus
 Rina Jordana Adnan
 Farahiya Ridzuan
 Rebecca Jane
 Angela Kais
 Anies Maizura
 Rozana Roslan

See also 
 Malaysia national men's futsal team
 Malaysia National Futsal League

References

External links 
 Arena Futsal Malaysia
 Football Association of Malaysia

 
Asian women's national futsal teams
National
2007 establishments in Malaysia
Women's football in Malaysia
Futsal clubs established in 2007